Hum Pardesi Ho Gaye was a Hindi language Indian television series that aired on Sony TV, which premiered on 4 March 2001. The series was produced by Shobhana Desai, and aired every Sundays at 9pm , it starred Kartika Rane, Aashish Chaudhary, and Perizaad Zorabian in the main lead. The series was nominated for numerous award categories at the time it was on-air, such as Prasoon Joshi was nominated for "TV Lyricist of the Year" award and Sanjay Upadhyay was nominated for "TV Director of the Year" award at the Indian Telly Awards in 2002.

Plot 
Shot extensively on locations abroad, Hum Pardesi Ho Gaye showed the story of a young, educated, Indian girl Mallika, who is hurriedly married to an NRI Rahul, within a short span of 10 days.

After marriage and moving abroad with him, she learns that he is in love with another woman (Maya). Mallika tries hard but just cannot seem to make any inroads into Rahul’s heart! Maya on the other hand is oblivious to Mallika’s existence and thinks that Rahul is all hers.

Season1

Cast
Kartika Rane - Mallika
Aashish Chaudhary - Rahul  
Perizaad Zorabian - Maya

Season2

Cast
Kartika Rane - Mallika
Aashish Chaudhary - Rahul  
Perizaad Zorabian - Maya
Sulbha Arya
Rakesh Pandey
Manoj Joshi
Mandeep Bhander
Amit Thakur
Sushama Prakash

References

Sony Entertainment Television original programming
Indian drama television series
2001 Indian television series debuts
2002 Indian television series endings